Alex MacFarlane is an Australian activist who is an intersex person born with XXY sex chromosomes in Victoria. MacFarlane is believed to be the first holder of an indeterminate birth certificate and passport.

Birth certificate and passport
MacFarlane is believed to be the first person in Australia to obtain a birth certificate recording sex as indeterminate, and the first Australian passport with an 'X' sex marker in 2003. MacFarlane was reported as receiving a passport with an 'X' sex descriptor in early 2003.

This was stated by the West Australian newspaper to be on the basis of a challenge by MacFarlane, using an indeterminate birth certificate issued by the State of Victoria. The West Australian newspaper reported in January 2003 that the Department of Foreign Affairs and Trade "had decided to accommodate people whose birth certificates recorded their sex as indeterminate... Alex is also believed to be the first Australian issued with a birth certificate acknowledging a gender other than male or female. Alex says "indeterminate – also known as intersex". It was issued in Alex's birth State of Victoria, which unlike WA, changed its policy to allow the category.

Several other Australians are known to have adopted sex non-specific or indeterminate identification documents subsequently, including Tony Briffa, and Norrie May-Welby.

See also
 Intersex human rights
 Legal recognition of intersex people
 Intersex rights in Australia

References

Australian activists
Intersex non-binary people
Intersex rights activists
Intersex rights in Australia
Non-binary activists
Living people
Year of birth missing (living people)
21st-century LGBT people
Agender people